Danylo Serhiyovych Knysh (born 3 March 1996) is a Ukrainian professional footballer who plays as a midfielder for Karpaty Lviv on loan from Metalist Kharkiv.

Career
Born in Artsyz, Knysh is a product of the Monolit Illichivsk and Dynamo Kyiv sportive schools.

He played for FC Dynamo in the Ukrainian Premier League Reserves and was released in September 2016. In March 2017 Knysh signed contract with FC Stal Kamianske in the Ukrainian Premier League. He made his debut in the Ukrainian Premier League for Stal Kamianske on 16 July 2017, playing in a winning match against FC Zorya Luhansk. In January 2023 he moved on loan to Karpaty Lviv.

References

External links 
 
 

1996 births
Living people
People from Artsyz
Ukrainian footballers
Ukraine student international footballers
Ukraine youth international footballers
Association football midfielders
FC Dynamo Kyiv players
FC Stal Kamianske players
FC Kalush players
FC Mynai players
FC Metalist Kharkiv players
FC Karpaty Lviv players
Ukrainian Premier League players
Ukrainian First League players
Ukrainian Second League players
Sportspeople from Odesa Oblast